Lesotho Airways, formerly Air Lesotho, was the national airline of Lesotho based on the grounds of Mejametalana Airport in Maseru. Until 1997, it was wholly owned by the Basotho government and operated both international and domestic passenger services to 16 destinations across 4 countries. Its main base was the Moshoeshoe International Airport. On October 1, 1996, Lesotho Airways had to suspend its international flights due to the inability to satisfy the minimum requirements specified by the Department of Civil Aviation. In 1997, Rossair Contracts Private Ltd acquired the assets of Lesotho Airways as it was financially insolvent.

Historical fleet

4 - de Havilland Canada DHC-6 Twin Otter
2 - Beechcraft 1900
1 - Fairchild Hiller FH-227
1 - Boeing 707-326C

See also		
 List of defunct airlines of Lesotho

References

External links
Fleet details

Defunct airlines of Lesotho
Airlines established in 1979
Airlines disestablished in 1996
1979 establishments in Africa
1996 disestablishments in Africa